Vijaya Kumar Rajah  (born 14 January 1957), better known as V. K. Rajah, is a Singaporean lawyer who served as the eighth attorney-general of Singapore between 2014 and 2017. Prior to his appointment as attorney-general, he served as a judge of the Court of Appeal of Singapore between 2007 and 2014, and a judge of the High Court of Singapore between 2004 and 2007.

Early life
Rajah was born in Singapore on 14 January 1957. 

His father was Thampore Thamby Rajah, better known as T. T. Rajah, a leader of Barisan Sosialis, and founder of one of the "Big Four" law firms in Singapore, Rajah & Tann.

Rajah graduated from the National University of Singapore with a Bachelor of Laws degree in 1982.

He went on to complete a Master of Laws with first class degree at Trinity Hall, Cambridge in 1986.

Career
Rajah was among the first batch of lawyers in Singapore to be appointed Senior Counsel in 1997, and was once the managing partner of law firm Rajah & Tann. He was also part of the National University of Singapore Faculty of Law moot team which won the Philip C. Jessup International Law Moot Court Competition in 1982, a first for the university. The other members of the team were Davinder Singh, Jimmy Yim and Steven Chong. He was first appointed Judicial Commissioner on 2 January 2004, Judge of the High Court on 1 November 2004, and subsequently Judge of Appeal in April 2007.

Rajah's publications include Judicial Management in Singapore (with T. C. Choong, Singapore: Butterworths, 1990). He was also the chair of a committee that produced an influential report in 2007 reviewing Singapore's legal sector.

Rajah has been a Director at Monetary Authority of Singapore since 1 November 2014.

Rajah served as Attorney-General of Singapore until he was succeeded by Lucien Wong on 14 January 2017. During his term, he "emphasised fair prosecution and outcomes", even appealing as a prosecutor for a reduced sentence in 2015, which was unprecedented in Singapore. Prime Minister Lee Hsien Loong thanked him for carrying out his duties "with dynamism and commitment".

References

External links

.

1957 births
Living people
Anglo-Chinese School alumni
National University of Singapore alumni
Alumni of Trinity Hall, Cambridge
Singaporean Hindus
Singaporean Judges of Appeal
Attorneys-General of Singapore
Singaporean people of Tamil descent
Singaporean people of Indian descent
Singaporean Senior Counsel
20th-century Singaporean lawyers
21st-century Singaporean judges